Reginald William Horne (19 July 1908 – 5 January 1984) was an English professional golfer whose most notable success came in winning the News of the World Match Play shortly after World War II had ended in 1945.

Horne won other important events on the British circuit. He nearly won the 1947 Open Championship at Hoylake, scoring a 71 in the final round to catch and overtake players like Henry Cotton and Norman Von Nida as the third round leaders all struggled, but in the end Irishman Fred Daly beat him by one shot. Horne regularly finished in the top thirty of the Open, over the following decade, without ever again coming as close to victory.

Professional wins
1945 News of the World Matchplay
1948 News Chronicle Tournament (tie with Allan Dailey)
1949 Daily Telegraph Foursomes Tournament (with Ronnie White)
1952 Silver King Tournament
1960 PGA Seniors Championship

Results in major championships

Note: Horne only played in The Open Championship.

NT = No tournament
CUT = missed the half-way cut
"T" indicates a tie for a place

Team appearances
Ryder Cup: 1947

References

English male golfers
Ryder Cup competitors for Europe
1908 births
1984 deaths